Helenoconcha minutissima is an extinct species of gastropod in the family Charopidae. It was endemic to Saint Helena.

References

Helenoconcha
Extinct gastropods
Taxonomy articles created by Polbot